The Book and the Sword is a Chinese television series adapted from Louis Cha's novel of the same title. The series was first broadcast on CCTV in China in 1994.

Cast
 as Chen Jialuo
 as Huoqingtong
 as Princess Fragrance
 as Qianlong Emperor
 as Yu Yutong
 as Li Yuanzhi
 as Wen Tailai
Ma Li as Luo Bing
Chen Jiming as Xu Tianhong
Ma Li as Zhou Qi
 as Lu Feiqing
Zhao Jian as Zhang Zhaozhong
 as Zhao Banshan
Quan Yu as Taoist Wuchen
Hao Wei as Xinyan
Wu Weidong as Yu Wanting
Liu Changsheng as Yuan Shixiao
Xue Wencheng as Li Kexiu
 as Yu Ruyi
Fan Liqiang as Bai Zhen
Liu Dagang as Yongzheng Emperor
 as Xu Chaosheng

External links

Chinese wuxia television series
Television series set in the Qing dynasty
Works based on The Book and the Sword
1990s Chinese television series
1994 Chinese television series debuts
1994 Chinese television series endings
Television shows about rebels
Mandarin-language television shows
Television shows based on works by Jin Yong
Qianlong Emperor